The second series of Race Across the World began airing on 8 March 2020 with five teams setting off from Chapultepec Castle in Mexico City in a race to the most southerly city in the world, Ushuaia in Argentina, covering a distance of 25,000 km in 2 months, passing through 7 checkpoints in Honduras, Panama, Colombia, Peru, Bolivia, Brazil, and Chile.  Each racer was given £1,453 for the whole trip, roughly £26 per day. Filming started in September 2019.

In this series, the 5 teams of racers were Dom & Lizzie, Jo & Sam, Jen & Rob, Shuntelle & Michael, and Emon and Jamiul. No one was eliminated this series but two teams decided to quit; Shuntelle & Michael left after losing half their money in leg 2 of the race, while Jo & Sam withdrew after they had run out of money in leg 7. The no-fly rule was abandoned this series due to civil unrest in Ecuador which made land travel through the country unsafe, and all the teams were flown from Colombia to Peru to continue the race.  The winners were Emon and Jamiul.

The number of episodes increased to nine this series; eight episodes on the race followed by a reunion special.

Contestants

Results summary 
Colour key:
 – Team withdrawn
 – Series winners

Route

The checkpoints in the second series are:

Race summary

Leg 1: Mexico City → Copán Ruinas

The first checkpoint was Copán Ruinas in Honduras. Shuntelle & Michael decided to travel to the northern Caribbean coast of the Yucatan Peninsula enroute to Belize. Dom & Lizzie chose to go from Oaxaca City to Guatemala via the Pacific coast route, but visited the infinity pool at Hierve el Agua while waiting for a bus at Oaxaca City. Emon & Jamiul chose the interior route so they could see the Mayan ruins at Palenque. Initially they had intended to go via Tonalá, but found that it would mean a six hour detour, and so changed bus half-way through. 

Jo & Sam also initially intended to go to Belize, but a stranger in San Cristóbal de las Casas advised them the ideal route was via Guatemala. This proved fortunate as it allowed them to reach Copán Ruinas first on day 6 of the race, despite stopping along the way to work for money at an organic farm in Antigua Guatemala. 

At Belize, Shuntelle & Michael and Jen & Rob managed to catch the boat from Placencia to Puerto Cortés in Honduras, but had to take shelter in Honduras after getting caught in Tropical Storm Karen on their way to Copán Ruinas. Emon & Jamiul missed the boat despite taking an expensive taxi ride to Placencia and had to wait until the following day for a boat. They finished last in this leg.

Leg 2: Copán Ruinas → Panama City

Jo & Sam chose to go through El Salvador to get to Nicaragua. Although they were the first team to leave, they worked for a day at a hostel in El Cuco, El Salvador collecting turtle eggs to earn some money, which lost them their lead. In an effort to get to the front, Dom & Lizzie decided to travel non-stop in Honduras from Santa Rosa de Copán on back-to-back buses, hopping from town to town, and became the first team to cross into  Nicaragua. After stopping in Limón, Costa Rica to work in a farm with the Bribri tribe, they arrived at the checkpoint in Panama City first on Day 14 of the race.

As they were a long way behind, Emon & Jamiul took the faster CA1 route via San Salvador to make up time. They also took an expensive direct bus ride from Managua to David, Panama. They overtook Jen & Rob, who took a break in León and the Monteverde Cloud Forest Reserve and were the last team to arrive at Panama City. 

In Honduras, after buying food at a stop, Michael found that he had lost his money belt containing £1,155, more than half of the team's remaining funds. Even though they tried to earn some money at the Ballena National Marine Park, Shuntelle & Michael decided to quit the race at the second checkpoint as they felt they could no longer compete with too little money left. 

 Shuntelle & Michael withdrew from the race after losing over a thousand pounds.

Leg 3: Panama City → Villavieja 

The original destination was to be Quito, Ecuador; however, due to civil unrest, the checkpoint was moved to the Bethel Hotel near Villavieja in the Tatacoa Desert of Colombia.  The teams were instructed to avoid  the Darién Gap, so they travelled by sea over the northern coast of Panama from Puerto Tupile in Cartí to the Colombian town Capurganá.

Although Dom & Lizzie were the first to leave, they had to stay overnight at Playón Chico and then missed the boat from Capurganá to Necoclí. As a result, all the teams met up at the port, just as two teams were queuing to leave for Necoclí. Jen & Rob managed to catch the next boat 5 minutes later, but Emon & Jamiul wrongly believed they had missed their chance, and decided to stay for a day at Capurganá and worked at a local scuba-diving school. Fortuitously, they were advised by the locals to travel on an obscure route from Medellín to Neiva. This choice helped them leap to the front, and they reached the checkpoint in the Tatacoa Desert near Villavieja first.

In order to save on accommodation cost, Jen & Rob took two night buses to reach Bogotá via Medellín. After a night in Bogotá, they took a bus heading to Neiva, but arranged a drop-off near Villavieja to avoid a detour. They then trekked to a river, crossing it by boat before reaching the checkpoint to finish second.
Jo & Sam decided to take a break at Medellín to relieve the stress of travelling. They then travelled via Cali where they tried to work in a dance club La Matraca, although Sam failed to complete his work as he found it stressful. 
Dom & Lizzie took a detour to work at Guatapé before going to Bogotá. However, this choice cost them the lead, and they finished behind all the other teams.

Leg 4: Villavieja → Puno 

Due to the continuing civil unrest in Ecuador, the teams were not allowed to travel to Peru by land or sea and were flown to the nearest airport in Jaén in Peru to continue the race.  The teams left the Jaén airport in the same order that they arrived in at the checkpoint in the Tatacoa Desert.  All the teams went down to the coast to travel to Peru's capital Lima. Emon & Jamiul went to Trujillo and they worked with fishermen for bed and board at Huanchaco, while Jen & Rob went via Chiclayo to a sanctuary for the spectacled bear. They again employed the strategy of travelling on a night bus to save on accommodation.

Both Jo & Sam and Dom & Lizzie also went to Lima via Chiclayo.  Jo & Sam chose a more expensive bus ride for greater comfort, as well as taking a break to go sandboarding in the desert oasis of Huacachina near Ica before travelling to their destination in Puno, which depleted their funds. However, as they did not stop to work along the way, Jo & Sam reached the checkpoint first, a hotel on an island connected to the shore of Lake Titicaca at Puno.

Both Emon & Jamiul and Dom & Lizzie went from Lima to Puno via a steeper route through Cusco. Although ahead of the others, Emon & Jamiul took a detour to see the Rainbow Mountain. Jen & Rob travelled in a slower but more gradual climb to Puno via Arequipa. They reached Puno at the same time as Emon & Jamiul, and beat them to the second spot at the checkpoint on Day 27. 

Dom & Lizzie spent a night working at a bar in Cusco. It delayed their journey to Puno, and they finished last for the second time.

Leg 5: Puno → Cafayate

All three teams apart from Dom & Lizzie went through Bolivia to reach their destination in this leg, which was at a vineyard outside of Cafayate in Argentina. The three teams travelled via La Paz but needed to pass through Bolivia within three days due to a pending election which would close the border.

Emon & Jamiul visited Valle de la Luna near La Paz and worked at the salt flat of Salinas Grandes to earn some extra money, but still managed to reach the checkpoint Grace Cafayate first on Day 33.

Jo & Sam visited the salt flat of Salar de Uyuni before taking a train from Uyuni to the border town of Villazón to cross into Argentina, where they worked for bed and board in Quebrada de Humahuaca before travelling to Cafayate.

Dom & Lizzie chose to go via Chile as the high altitude was making Dom feeling unwell. Dom suffered a seizure while trying to leave Puno, and was forced to stay an extra day back at the checkpoint hotel, before he and Lizzie left 35 hours after the leaders. In order to catch up, they travelled on back-to-back buses, but were trapped at San Pedro de Atacama by a lack of connecting routes, so were forced to take a break in the Atacama Desert. However, civil unrest broke out in Chile and they had to be evacuated to Argentina by car.  They were again the last team to arrive at the checkpoint.

Leg 6: Cafayate → Ilha Grande

The racers embarked on the longest leg of the race so far, travelling 3,600 km east to Ilha Grande in Brazil. The long journey across more expensive countries depleted the funds for all the teams. 

3 teams concluded that they had to travel via Salta to catch a bus to the border.  Both Emon & Jamiul and Jen & Rob chose a shorter route via Paraguay. Emon & Jamiul stopped at Asunción to work in a retirement home. Jen & Rob went to see the Iguazu Falls, and they also took a longer detour for a break to attend the Oktoberfest at Blumenau, which delayed their journey further. They finished second to Emon & Jamiul on Day 40 of the race. 

Both Jo & Sam and Dom & Lizzie went on a longer route from Argentina to Brazil before travelling up along the Atlantic coast. Although Dom & Lizzie were the last to leave, at the Cafayete bus station, they were informed by a local that there was a direct bus route to Corrientes. There they caught up with Jo & Sam, who had been forced to stay in Salta overnight. Both teams decided to share a mini-van ride to the border with Brazil to avoid further delay.

Jo & Sam went to Praia do Rosa where they worked for bed and board, as well as a chance for Sam  to learn how to surf. Both the last two teams arrived at the checkpoint on the island at the same time, with Dom & Lizzie just pipping Jo & Sam to the third spot.

Leg 7: Ilha Grande → Mendoza 

The teams travelled back to Argentina to the penultimate leg of the race. Apart from Jen & Rob, all teams faced financial restrictions in continuing with the race.  Jen & Rob, despite missing their boat and bus and working in a hostel in Porto Alegre, travelled the quickest and reached the destination in Mendoza, Argentina first on Day 47. 

Emon & Jamiul chose a longer route through Uruguay as they needed to earn money.  They cleaned yachts in Punta del Este, and then worked at a barber shop in Buenos Aires.  Dom & Lizzie also had to find ways to save on money, and decided to hitch-hike from the border of Argentina to Posadas, where they worked cleaning boats, before travelling to Mendoza.

Jo & Sam no longer had enough money to finish the leg, so were forced to travel in the opposite direction for work in Rio de Janeiro. They also worked on the bus in Argentina to pay for half their fare to go to Córdoba, Argentina, where they worked on a cattle ranch.  With their funds virtually gone, they quit the race at the ranch.

Leg 8: Mendoza → Ushuaia 

Jen & Rob  went to Neuquén before deciding to take the mountain route to Bariloche to work. However, travelling to the mountain instead of the faster coastal route delayed their journey. As Emon & Jamiul were running low on money, they decided to work in Mendoza while waiting for a bus to Bahía Blanca. They also worked on a fishing boat in Puerto San Julián. They secured a free ride with a fisherman to Río Gallegos. 

Dom & Lizzie also went to Neuquén for work in an almond plantation nearby. They spent most of their money going to Río Gallegos and were the first to arrive there.  However, there was no connecting bus to Río Grande until the following day, which allowed all the teams to meet up, and they travelled on the same bus to Río Grande.  Dom & Lizzie did not have enough money to pay for a taxi to Ushuaia, so had to hitch-hike all the way and were the last to arrive.  Both Jen & Rob and Emon & Jamiul took taxis. Although Emon & Jamiul did not have enough money to pay for all the fare, they negotiated with the driver to pay for the rest of the fare with an mp3 player. Both teams reached Ushuaia around the same time, and in a foot race, first to Arakur Ushuaia hotel and then the final checkpoint at the summit of Cerro Alarkén, Emon & Jamiul beat Jen & Rob to win the race by 20 seconds.

Reception
In the second series, Joel Golby of The Guardian judged it "an astounding piece of TV" that "captures all the vibrant highs and exhausted lows of travel in all of their raw glory", and one that made him "genuinely caring how this one ends and the impact it will have on the lives of those who lived it".  Anita Singh of The Telegraph thought "the casting is one of the strengths of the series" and she "can't help but warm to these wacky racers". However, Chris Moss of the same paper was more negative; he found that the obstacles the contestants faced were "largely fictive" and the tension "fabricated", and thought the show used the "old idiot abroad trope", and the viewers were "asked not to marvel at faraway places but to engage with the participants". Equally negative was Barry Didcock of The Herald who considered the show's premise of travelling without flying "a frivolous exercise" and of questionable taste as the budget of racers would exceed that of a refugee at the Mexico-Guatemala border. In contrast, Shaun Kitchener wrote in Metro that the show "is the heartfelt light we all need in these dark times" as it was aired during the COVID-19 pandemic. With the "masterful combination of escapism (the scenery!), warmth (the contestants!), drama (the conflict!) and adrenaline (the actual race!), Race Across The World is a merciful piece of TV to keep us briefly distracted over the next few weeks".

Ratings
The first episode had an overnight rating of 1.9 million.  The penultimate episode showing the final leg of the race was watched by an overnight audience of 3.3 million.

References

External links
Race Across the World (series 2)

2020 British television seasons
Television shows filmed in Mexico
Television shows filmed in Belize
Television shows filmed in Guatemala
Television shows filmed in Honduras
Television shows filmed in El Salvador
Television shows filmed in Nicaragua
Television shows filmed in Costa Rica
Television shows filmed in Panama
Television shows filmed in Colombia
Television shows filmed in Peru
Television shows filmed in Bolivia
Television shows filmed in Chile
Television shows filmed in Argentina
Television shows filmed in Brazil
Television shows filmed in Uruguay